Love and a .45 is a 1994 indie crime drama road movie written and directed by C.M. Talkington, starring Gil Bellows and Renée Zellweger. It received positive reviews.

Plot
A young couple in love — Watty Watts and Starlene — are planning a convenience store robbery. The next day, they are paid a visit by Creepy Cody and Dinosaur Bob, collectors for a local mobster whom Watty has borrowed money from to buy an engagement ring for Starlene. They inform Watty that he must get the money very soon. This is followed by a visit by Watts' drug-addicted former prison buddy, Billy Mack Black, who has a plan for a big score. Against the wishes of Starlene, Watty goes along with the plot and the robbery turns deadly when Billy shoots and kills the stoned clerk.

Following the murder, Billy pulls his gun on Watty and forces him to go to a restaurant to eat breakfast, where Billy pulls his gun on Watty again. Fearing for his life, Watty attacks Billy with a fork and escapes. He then returns to his trailer and Starlene. He asks her to marry him and tells her they have to flee to Mexico. They are then paid a visit by two police officers, who try to kill them as revenge for the murder and robbery. Starlene manages to shoot one of the officers, who accidentally shoots the other one, and the couple escape.

They then make their way toward Mexico pursued by Billy Mack, Bob and Creepy and the police. The two are romanticized in the crime-obsessed media and become celebrities. On the way they stop in to see Starlene's parents, Thaylene and Vergil, who are later found by Billy, Bob and Creepy, leading to a violent showdown in which all are killed except Billy.

Billy catches up with Watty and Starlene and the three of them cross into Mexico together. There the three engage in a showdown in which Starlene eventually kills Billy by injecting him with an overdose of high-powered speed.

The two lovers take some liquid LSD given to them by Starlene's father and drive off into the sunset to start a new life.

Cast

Soundtrack

External links
 
 
 
 

1994 films
1994 crime drama films
1994 directorial debut films
1994 independent films
1990s crime comedy-drama films
1990s road movies
American chase films
American crime comedy-drama films
American independent films
American road movies
Films set in Mexico
Films set in Texas
Films shot in Texas
Trimark Pictures films
1990s English-language films
1990s American films